Cuatro Cañadas is a town in Bolivia. In 2009 it had an estimated population of 7,305.

References

Populated places in Santa Cruz Department (Bolivia)